Liangyuan District is one of the two districts of the city of Shangqiu, Henan province. The name Liangyuan, or "the garden of Liang", follows from the name Prince Xiao of Liang, who built the garden around 154 BC centered in the area of nowadays Shangqiu. At present, Liangyuan district hosts the government of Shangqiu city.

Administrative divisions
As 2012, this district is divided to 10 subdistricts, 3 towns and 7 townships.
Subdistricts

Towns
Xieji
Shuangba
Zhangge

Townships

References

County-level divisions of Henan
Shangqiu